The 2018 Italian GT Championship was the 27th season of the Italian GT Championship, the grand tourer-style sports car racing founded by the Italian automobile club (ACI). The Champsionship consisted of seven Sprint race events. At each event there were held two races. The Season started on 27 April in Imola and ended on 28 October in Mugello.

Calendar

Teams and Drivers

GT3

GT3 Light

Super GT Cup

GT Cup

GT4

Results
Overall winner is Bold.

References

Italian Motorsports Championships
2018 in Italian motorsport